"Intermezzo No. 1" is an instrumental track from Swedish pop group ABBA's self-titled third album, released in April 1975. It was the first of only two tracks by the group not to contain lyrics; the other was the title track of their 1976 release, Arrival. It is the only purely instrumental ABBA song however, as Arrival includes "a static layer of rich harmony vocals". On the cover, the song was credited as "Intermezzo No.1 featuring Benny Andersson".

Production
Written by Benny Andersson and Björn Ulvaeus, the orchestral rock tune was recorded on October 16, 1974, in Stockholm's Glen and Metronome Studios under the working title "Mama". Another working title for the song was Bach-låten (The Bach Tune). In September 1975, it was released as the B-side to ABBA's single, "Mamma Mia". Carl Magnus Palm describes it as a "showcase of Benny's classical music influences", which first began to appear in his work with The Hep Stars songs “Sunny Girl” and “Wedding”.

Carl Magnus Palm explains the song was a "popular feature on every subsequent ABBA tour" after the ABBA album was released. For example, the song is shown being performed in the 1977 concert tours in the film ABBA: The Movie.

Composition
The song has a "piano and guitar-led instrumental". Many of ABBA's pieces are full of "thematic throwaways of the rich folk music culture [of Sweden]". This song is a "solo vehicle" in which to indulge in classical music. The grand piano is the central instrument, layered by a "flamboyant network of synth textures and brass punches". ABBA: Let The Music Speak explains "the main theme is inviting and uncomplicated, constantly giving way to a rapid-fire succession of mood-swinging secondary themes".

Critical reception
Music News lists the song as one of ABBA's "ambitious tracks...that showcase Andersson and Ulvaeus' classical leanings while demonstrating their abilities as proficient songwriters". Der Tagesspiegel says the song, "in contrast to the catchy masterpiece [Mamma Mia]" that it was coupled with on the single, "has a rather psychedelic-disturbing character". Abba's Abba Gold notes that ABBA Gold doesn't include any of the "lackadaisical instrumentals ABBA threw about" like "Arrival" or "Intermezzo No.1". It adds though "fans like the albums precisely for these oddities". Abba – Uncensored on the Record describes the song as an "impressive instrumental". Bright Lights Dark Shadows: The Real Story of Abba explains that while "experiments in applying classical music to a pop format were very much in vogue at the time [Intermezzo No.1] ha[s] come to seem a little dated". It nevertheless describes the song as "show[ing] a sense of musical ambition" and an "opus". Carl Magnus Palm says for fans of ambitious music, the song "probably remains a highlight in the ABBA oeuvre", while to those who prefer more straightforward pop hits, the song "has aged less well". ABBA: Let The Music Speak says the song is "whimsical and melodramatic" and "a sophisticated pastiche of all that is great and wondrous in the world of classical music, injected with a shot of late twentieth century pop enthusiasm".

References 

1970s instrumentals
1975 songs
ABBA songs
Pop instrumentals
Songs written by Benny Andersson and Björn Ulvaeus